Yei (Yey, Jei, Je, Yei-Nan) is a Papuan language of New Guinea. The Upper and Lower Yey dialects are only mutually intelligible with difficulty.

Distribution

References

Yam languages
Languages of western New Guinea